Misael Browarnik Beiguel (born June 10, 1976) better known as Michel Brown is an Argentine actor, singer and Television presenter.

Career 
He was discovered by Argentine producer Cris Morena for her teen variety show Jugate Conmigo. Cris Morena also produced his solo album (titled Michel) and gave him a starring role in popular kids soap Chiquititas.

In 1999, Michel decided to invest in his international career and traveled to Mexico, where he got a role in the teen telenovela DKDA Sueños de Juventud for Televisa and soon signed a contract with No. 2 network TV Azteca. The same year he also starred in the video for the track "Out of Control" by the UK  big beat act The Chemical Brothers.

He became one of Latin-America and Spain's most popular performers after starring  as Franco Reyes in the popular telenovela Pasión de Gavilanes, which became the top-rated soap opera in several countries, including his native Argentina and Spain, where he became a huge star.

He is the host of the Univision network version of Survivor, titled Desafío: La Gran Batalla, which premiered June 20, 2010.

Filmography

Film

Television programs

Television

Theater

Awards and nominations

References

External links 

1976 births
Argentine male film actors
Argentine male telenovela actors
Jewish Argentine male actors
Living people
Male actors from Buenos Aires
Argentine Jews
Argentine people of Russian-Jewish descent